The Winnie Broadcasting Tower is a  tall guyed FM radio mast located northwest of Winnie, Texas, USA. It is the tallest structure in Texas, equaling the Liberman Broadcasting tower. It is currently owned by EMF and only has 103.7, KHJK on it.

See also
 United States tallest structures
 List of masts

References

Towers in Texas
Towers completed in 2005
2005 establishments in Texas